Manufacturing operations concern the operation of a facility, as opposed to maintenance, supply and distribution, health, and safety, emergency response, human resources, security, information technology and other infrastructural support organizations.

Personnel that make up "operations" are

 operators
 engineers
 technicians
 management

This is mainly in a manufacturing setting.

Manufacturing